Edward William Seward (June 29, 1867 – July 30, 1947), born as Edward William Sourhardt, was an American Major League Baseball pitcher for six seasons from 1885 to 1891. Seward made his professional baseball debut in 1884 at age 16 with Terre Haute of the Northwestern League. Because of his age, he was referred to as "Kid" Seward. Known for his curve ball, Seward later played for the Providence Grays, Philadelphia Athletics, and Cleveland Spiders. After his playing career ended, Seward umpired a total of 27 games in the National League in 1892 and 1893.

See also
List of Major League Baseball annual strikeout leaders
List of Major League Baseball no-hitters

External links

, or Retrosheet

1867 births
1947 deaths
19th-century baseball players
Major League Baseball pitchers
Philadelphia Athletics (AA) players
Providence Grays players
Cleveland Spiders players
Terre Haute (minor league baseball) players
London Cockneys players
Erie (minor league baseball) players
Binghamton Crickets (1880s) players
Rochester Maroons players
Providence Grays (minor league) players
Menominee (minor league baseball) players
Baseball players from Cleveland